The 2015 Red Bull Air Race of Las Vegas was the eighth round of the 2015 Red Bull Air Race World Championship season, the tenth season of the Red Bull Air Race World Championship. The event was held at the Las Vegas Motor Speedway, on the outskirts of Las Vegas, Nevada.

Master Class

Qualification

Round of 14

  Pilot received 2 seconds in penalties.
  Pilot received 3 seconds in penalties.
  Pilot received 5 seconds in penalties.

Round of 8

 Pilot received 2 seconds in penalties.
 Pilot received 5 seconds in penalties.

Final 4

Challenger Class

Results

Standings after the event

Master Class standings

Challenger Class standings

 Note: Only the top five positions are included for both sets of standings.
 Note: The Challenger Class event in Las Vegas was a 'winner take all' finale – Mikaël Brageot won the event and the title despite being equal on points with Petr Kopfstein and Daniel Ryfa.

References

External links

|- style="text-align:center"
|width="35%"|Previous race:2015 Red Bull Air Race of Fort Worth
|width="30%"|Red Bull Air Race2015 season
|width="35%"|Next race:2016 Red Bull Air Race of Abu Dhabi
|- style="text-align:center"
|width="35%"|Previous race:2014 Red Bull Air Race of Las Vegas
|width="30%"|Red Bull Air Race of Las Vegas
|width="35%"|Next race:2016 Red Bull Air Race of Las Vegas
|- style="text-align:center"

Las Vegas
Red Bull Air Race World Championship
Red Bull Air Race World Championship, Las Vegas
Red Bull
Red Bull Air Race of Las Vegas 2015